Count Alexander Romanovich Vorontsov (4 February 17412 December 1805) was the Chancellor of the Russian Empire during the early years of Alexander I's reign.

He began his career at the age of fifteen in the Izmailovsky regiment of the Guards. He was the son of Russian General-in-chief Roman Illarionovich Vorontsov (1707—1783) and Marfa Ivanovna Surmina (1718—1745). In 1759, Alexander's uncle, the grand chancellor Mikhail Illarionovich Vorontsov, sent him to Strasbourg, Paris and Madrid to train him in diplomacy. Under Peter III, who was in love with his sister Elizabeth, he represented Russia for a short time at the court of St James's. Catherine II created him a senator and president of the Board of Trade; but she never liked him, and ultimately (1791) compelled him to retire from public life.

In 1802, Alexander I summoned him back to office and appointed him imperial chancellor. This was the period of the triumph of the Vorontsovs, who had always insisted on the necessity of a close union with Austria and Great Britain, in opposition to Nikita Panin and his followers, who had leaned on France or Prussia till the outbreak of the French Revolution made friendship with France impossible.

Vorontsov was also an implacable opponent of Napoleon Bonaparte, whose "topsy-turvyness" he was never weary of denouncing. The rupture with Napoleon in 1803 is mainly attributable to him. He also took a leading part in the internal administration and was in favour of a thorough reform of the Governing Senate and the ministries. He retired in 1804. A lifelong bachelor, he possessed an extraordinary memory and a firm and wide grasp of history. His Memoirs of My Own Times is printed in vol. VII of the Vorontsov Archives.

Family members 
Vorontsov - his family
Mikhail Illarionovich Vorontsov - his uncle
Ekaterina Romanovna Vorontsova-Dashkova - his sister
Elizaveta Vorontsova - his sister
Semyon Romanovich Vorontsov - his brother
Mikhail Semyonovich Vorontsov - his nephew.

References

External links
Online Museum of the Vorontsov Family

Senators of the Russian Empire
Foreign ministers of the Russian Empire
Chancellors of the Russian Empire
Members of the State Council (Russian Empire)
Counts of the Russian Empire
1741 births
1805 deaths
Ambassadors of the Russian Empire
18th-century people from the Russian Empire
Alexander
Ambassadors of the Russian Empire to the United Kingdom